Michael Christian is an American actor best known for such films and television series as Peyton Place as Joe Rossi, Poor Pretty Eddie, Hard Knocks and Private Obsession.

References

External links

1943 births
Living people
American male film actors
American male television actors
Male actors from Baltimore
Screenwriters from Maryland